By-elections to the 21st Canadian Parliament were held to fill vacancies in the House of Commons of Canada between the 1949 federal election and the 1953 federal election. The Liberal Party of Canada led a majority government for the 21st Canadian Parliament.

30 vacant seats were filled through by-elections.

See also
List of federal by-elections in Canada

Notes

References

Sources
 Parliament of Canada–Elected in By-Elections 

1952 elections in Canada
1951 elections in Canada
1950 elections in Canada
1949 elections in Canada
21st